City of Adelaide was an electoral district of the South Australian House of Assembly, the lower house of the bicameral legislature of the then colony of South Australia.

City of Adelaide was one of the original districts of the first Assembly created in 1857; it was abolished in 1862, when the new 
East Adelaide and  West Adelaide districts were created, each with two members.

Members

References

Former electoral districts of South Australia
1857 establishments in Australia
1862 disestablishments in Australia